Smin Awa Naing Min Thiri (also spelled Thamein Inwa Naing (သမိန် အင်းဝနိုင်, lit. "Lord of Victory over Ava"); also known as Awa Mingyi (အဝ မင်းကြီး, lit. "Great Lord of Ava")) was an early 15th-century senior Hanthawaddy court official and military commander. A trusted adviser of King Razadarit, Awa Naing is best remembered in Burmese history for the 1415 battle of Dala–Twante in which his undermanned regiment mortally wounded Crown Prince Minye Kyawswa of Ava.

He was the father of Queen Mi Ta-Lat, a principal consort of King Binnya Dhammaraza.

Background
The royal chronicles say nothing explicitly about his background. However, since King Minkhaung I of Ava addressed him as the "royal elder brother, royal in-law", it can be inferred that Awa Naing was older than but of the same generation as Minkhaung (b. 1373), and likely hailed from a branch of the Martaban–Hanthawaddy royal family. The first explicit mention of his three known names/titles (Awa/Inwa Naing, Awa/Inwa Mingyi, Min Thiri) in the chronicles is when one Smin Awa Naing sailed up the Irrawaddy river with the Hanthawaddy armed forces that invaded the Ava Kingdom in 1401. He later received the title of "Awa Mingyi" (အဝ မင်းကြီး, lit. "Great Lord of Ava") in 1408 for his success in disrupting Ava's supply lines.

Career
Awa Naing Min Thiri served both as a commander and as a court official during King Razadarit's reign from 1401 onwards. He was one of the few commanders the king trusted to defend the Mon-speaking kingdom's key defensive positions en route to the capital Pegu (Bago). It was Awa Naing that successfully withstood Ava's most fierce attacks of the war at Dala–Twante (1414–1415), Bassein (Pathein) (1415) and Syriam (Thanlyin) (1417–1418). Furthermore, he was already a senior minister at the court by 1408.

Battle of Dala (1414–1415)

Awa Naing is best known for the battle of Dala that culminated in March 1415. He had led the defense of the city since the start of Ava's dry season offensive in late 1414; indeed, his defenses were teetering on the brink of collapse until Hanthawaddy relief forces broke the siege in early March. This set up the famous battle outside the city. On 13 March 1415, Ava forces returned with Crown Prince Minye Kyawswa himself leading the charge. Razadarit fielded a sizable force to meet the enemy. Awa Naing's small regiment (300 or 500 troops) marched close to Razadarit's main army and behind three vanguard regiments led by the king's three sons. The battle came to him. Minye Kyawswa on his favorite war elephant broke through the vanguard forces, forcing Razadarit himself to retreat. Awa Naing however saw that the crown prince had advanced too far ahead of his supporting troops, and ordered his troops to engage the crown prince. Awa Naing's troops subsequently managed to take down both the crown prince and his exhausted elephant. Minye Kyawswa died shortly after.

Awa Naing instantly became a high value target for the Ava command. In April, Ava forces led by King Minkhaung himself rampaged through the Irrawaddy delta and showed up before the fortified city of Bassein (Pathein) where Awa Naing had been reassigned to. But with the rainy season fast approaching, Minkhaung asked for a meeting with Awa Naing, who accepted. However, the meeting did not take place as Awa Naing came under an unauthorized assassination attempt as he came out of the gate. A servant of Prince Minye Kyawhtin, eldest son of the late Minye Kyawswa, threw a spear at Awa Naing but it fell short. A furious and embarrassed Minkhaung sent the servant to Awa Naing, who ultimately spared the servant's life. The king of Ava later sent presents to Awa Naing, and withdrew his forces from the delta altogether.

Aftermath
Minye Kyawswa's death ended what turned out to be Ava's most serious threat to Pegu and the height of the war. The war did continue listlessly for the next few years. Awa Naing again proved his defensive prowess in the 1417–1418 dry season when he successfully defended Syriam (Thanlyin). The campaign was not only the last campaign during the reigns of kings Razadarit and Minkhaung but also the last mention of Awa Naing in the chronicles. His name is conspicuously absent from the chronicles' list of figures who took part in the succession crisis, following Razadarit's sudden death in 1421. While Prince Binnya Dhammaraza, who was married to Awa Naing's daughter Mi Ta-Lat, emerged as king, it is unclear if Awa Naing was still alive or played any role in his son-in-law's regime.

Military service
The following is a list of military campaigns in which Smin Awa Naing, Awa Mingyi or Min Thiri is explicitly mentioned as a commander in the royal chronicles. All of the campaigns were part of the Forty Years' War.

Notes

References

Bibliography
 
 
 
 
 
 
 

Ava dynasty
Hanthawaddy dynasty
Burmese generals